Hebeloma circinans is a species of mushroom in the family Hymenogastraceae.

circinans
Fungi of Europe